Thomas le Despenser, 2nd Baron Despenser, 1st Earl of Gloucester KG (22 September 137313 January 1400) was the son of Edward le Despenser, 1st Baron le Despencer, whom he succeeded in 1375.

Royal intrigues

A supporter of Richard II against Thomas of Woodstock and the Lords Appellant, he was rewarded with an Earldom as Earl of Gloucester in 1397, by virtue of being descended from Gilbert de Clare, 7th earl of an earlier creation. He spent the years 1397–99 in Ireland, attempting with little success to persuade the Gaelic chieftains to accept Richard II as their overlord.

However, he supported Henry Bolingbroke on his return to England to become King Henry IV, only to be attainted (deprived of his Earldom because of a capital crime) for his role in the death of Thomas of Woodstock.

He then took part in the Epiphany Rising, a rebellion led by a number of Barons aimed at restoring Richard to the throne by assassinating King Henry IV; this quickly failed when the conspirators were betrayed by Edward of Norwich, 2nd Duke of York to Henry.  After fleeing to the western counties, a number of the Epiphany Rising conspirators were captured and killed by mobs of townspeople loyal to the king; Despenser was captured by a mob and beheaded at Bristol on 13 January 1400.

Marriage

Thomas le Despenser married Constance, daughter of Edmund of Langley, 1st Duke of York and Isabella of Castile, Duchess of York. They had issue:

 Elizabeth le Despenser (died young c. 1398)
 Richard le Despenser, 4th Baron Burghersh (1396–1414)
 Edward le Despenser (born before 1400), died young
 Hugh le Despenser (c. 1400–1401)
 Isabel le Despenser (26 July 140027 December 1439); she married first Richard Beauchamp, 1st Earl of Worcester, and later married second his cousin Richard de Beauchamp, 13th Earl of Warwick

Ancestry and succession

References

 thePeerage.com
Otway-Ruthven, A.J. History of Medieval Ireland  Barnes and Noble reprint New York 1993

1373 births
1400 deaths
14th-century English nobility
People executed under the Lancastrians
Knights of the Garter
Executed English people
People executed under the Plantagenets by decapitation
Thomas
Thomas le Despenser, 1st Earl of Gloucester
Lords of Glamorgan
Barons le Despencer